Kenneth D. Peterson (born 1935) is a member of the State House of Representatives of Montana.  A native of Babb, Montana, Peterson received his bachelor's degree from Brigham Young University and his JD from the University of Montana.  
Peterson served in both private practice and as a city attorney in Soap Lake, Washington (1968–73) and Billings, Montana (1977-84).  He was elected to the Montana State legislature in 2000 but lost his bid for re-election in 2002.  He was again elected to the State Legislature beginning his current period of service in 2007.

Peterson and his wife Cherye are the parents of six children.  Peterson is a Latter-day Saint.

References

External links
Project Vote Smart bio on Peterson

1935 births
Latter Day Saints from Montana
Brigham Young University alumni
University of Montana alumni
American lawyers
Members of the Montana House of Representatives
Living people
People from Glacier County, Montana
Politicians from Billings, Montana
People from Soap Lake, Washington